Sahara Samay is a Hindi-language 24/7 news television channel, owned by Sahara India Pariwar. The channel is a free-to-air and launched on 28 March 2003. The channel is available across all major cable and DTH platforms as well as online.

The network offers five regional 24x7 news channels catering to millions and millions of Hindi speaking viewers in the states of U.P./Uttarakhand, M.P./Chhattisgarh, Bihar/Jharkhand, Delhi/NCR and Mumbai. Additionally the network also offers 'Samay', a 24-hr national news channel broadcast in over 66 countries.

Notable people

 Upenderra Rai CEO and editor-in-chief of Sahara News Network
 Dr. Meena Sharma worked here aged 26 gaining government recognition for her work.

References

Hindi-language television channels in India
Television channels and stations established in 2004
Hindi-language television stations
Television stations in New Delhi